Banbridge railway station was on the Banbridge Junction Railway which ran from Scarva to Banbridge in Northern Ireland.

History

The station was opened on 23 March 1859.

It was the terminus of the Banbridge Junction Railway until the opening of the Banbridge, Lisburn and Belfast Railway station Banbridge BLBR, when this station closed in October 1863.

References 

Disused railway stations in County Down
Railway stations opened in 1859
Railway stations closed in 1863
1859 establishments in Ireland
railway station
Railway stations in Northern Ireland opened in the 19th century